Rainsville is an unincorporated community located in Mora County, New Mexico, United States. Rainsville has a post office with ZIP code 87736, which opened on July 8, 1920. Formerly known as Llano del Coyote, Rainsville took the name of its first postmaster, a Mr. Rains.

References

External links
Rainsville post office history

Unincorporated communities in Mora County, New Mexico
Unincorporated communities in New Mexico